André Ferro Pires (born 7 February 1990 in Sobral de Monte Agraço) is a Portuguese footballer who plays as a left back.

External links

André Pires at ZeroZero

1990 births
Living people
Portuguese footballers
Association football defenders
Primeira Liga players
Liga Portugal 2 players
C.F. Os Belenenses players
S.C. Braga B players
S.C. Olhanense players
C.D. Trofense players
C.D. Santa Clara players
GS Loures players
U.D. Vilafranquense players
Sportspeople from Lisbon District